The Sanskrit epic Mahabharata contains several enumeration of tribes or clans.

The earliest terms used "clan" or "tribe" in Vedic Sanskrit were jana and vis. Heinrich Zimmer regarded the word vis to denote a social structure identical with the English "tribe", and different from a grama which, he considered, represented a "clan"—midway between "family" (kula) and tribe. AC Das believed, on the other hand, that: an aggregation of Vedic families formed a gotra; a group of gotras constituted a gosthi; and a group of gosthis became a grama. 
A vis comprised a number of these gramas and denotes a territorial "district". In Das' opinion, jana more properly designates a tribe, which was an association of neighbouring districts.

Broadly, there are  four principal lists in Mahabharata:
Comprising respectively the tribes defeated by Yudhishthira's four brothers (Sabha Parva, Book 2 Chapters  23-29
Tribes bringing gifts at Yudhishthira's consecration as king emperor Sabha Parva, Book 2 Chapters 45-48
Tribes mentioned in the 'geography' in Bhishma Parva, Book 6 Chapter X
Kings and warriors of various tribes, who came to the ceremony for investing Kartikeya with the status of generalissimo: Shalya Parva, Book IX Chapter 44

Notes

External links 
 The Mahabharata in Sanskrit: Index

Social groups of India
Mahabharata